Field High School is a public high school located in Brimfield, Ohio, United States.  It is the only high school in the Field Local School District, which mainly enrolls students from Brimfield and Suffield townships, and the southern part of Kent.  Their athletic teams are known as the  Falcons, and the school colors are red, white, and black. The principal is Michael Geraghty  and the assistant principal is Ashley Mauger. The school offers honors classes that include Honors English 9–12, A.P. Literature and Composition, Honors Math (Algebra I & II, Geometry, and AP Calculus), and Honors Science (Biology, I, and II, Chemistry, and Physics).

Main Staff 
Principal: Michael Geraghty

Assistant Principal: Ashley Mauger

Athletic Director: Greg Kulick

Counselor (Grade 9 & 11): Melissa Nero

Counselor (Grade 10 & 12): Chelsea Heim

Guidance Secretary: Debbie Yeich

State championships

 Boys' cross country – 1994, 1997
 Girls' cross country – 1997, 1998

Notable alumni
 Jani Lane, lead singer of Warrant
 Kate Tucker, singer and songwriter, lead singer and guitarist for Kate Tucker & the Sons of Sweden
 Janis Mars Wunderlich, ceramic artist

External links

References

High schools in Portage County, Ohio
Public high schools in Ohio